Wasabi Mon Amour (Traditional Chinese: 和味濃情) is a TVB modern drama series broadcast in January 2008.

Synopsis 
Melt in mouth
Glow of heart
Come experience different tastes of life

Japanese cuisine chef Chung Lai-Wo (Michael Tao) has long been in love with his childhood friend Ko Yau-Mei (Louisa So), who is always interested in pursuing a career in showbiz. To realize her dream, Wo lies to the press and refers to Mei as "a most talented chef of the time". With Wo's help, Mei has finally landed a job as the host of a food program. As Mei is completely clueless about cooking, Wo decides to do her a favor by offering to be her assistant, which irritates his mentor Ko Shau (Paul Chun), also father of Mei, beyond measure.

Although the food program turns out to be very popular, Mei often gets picked on by her half sister Ko Yim-Lai (Bernice Liu) while at work. Lai is angry with Shau for being bad to her mother and she means to make things difficult for Mei as revenge.  In order to boost her fame and the ratings, Mei reveals to the media the private life of Wo and herself, consequently leading Wo's career to a downfall. To escape from the misery of failure in both career and relationship, Wo decides to leave for Japan and starts a new life there. Shau feels the need to give Mei a lesson and resolves to reveal the truth to the press. In the meantime, Lai has also exposed a long-kept secret of Shau, which has severely tarnished his reputation in his field overnight.

Cast

Viewership ratings

Awards and nominations
41st TVB Anniversary Awards (2008)
 "Best Drama"
 "Best Actor in a Supporting Role" (Paul Chun - Ko Sau)
 "Best Actress in a Supporting Role" (Bernice Liu - Ally Ko Yau-Lai)

References

External links
TVB.com Wasabi Mon Amour - Official Website 

TVB dramas
2008 Hong Kong television series debuts
2008 Hong Kong television series endings